Athmalgola, a town situated in the district of Patna in Bihar.

Demographics
 India census, Athmalgola block had a population of 90,964, with 48,169 men and 42,795 women. Athmalgola has an average literacy rate of 49.7% .

References

Cities and towns in Patna district